Ana Makharadze (born 24 August 1997) is a Georgian footballer who plays as a midfielder. She has been a member of the Georgia women's national team.

References

1997 births
Living people
Women's association football midfielders
Women's footballers from Georgia (country)
Georgia (country) women's international footballers